Choro ("cry" or "lament"), also popularly called chorinho ("little cry" or "little lament"), is an instrumental Brazilian popular music genre which originated in 19th century Rio de Janeiro. Despite its name, the music often has a fast and happy rhythm. It is characterized by virtuosity, improvisation and subtle modulations, and is full of syncopation and counterpoint. Choro is considered the first characteristically Brazilian genre of urban popular music. The serenaders who play choros are known as chorões.

Choro instruments

Originally choro was played by a trio of flute, guitar and cavaquinho (a small chordophone with four strings). Other instruments commonly played in choro are the mandolin, clarinet, saxophone, trumpet and trombone. These melody instruments are backed by a rhythm section composed of 6-string guitar, 7-string guitar (playing bass lines) and light percussion, such as a pandeiro. The cavaquinho appears sometimes as a melody instrument, other times as part of the rhythm.

Compositional structure
Structurally, a choro composition usually has three parts, played in a rondo form: AABBACCA, with each section typically in a different key (usually the tonal sequence is: principal key->relative mode->sub-dominant key).  There are a variety of choros in both major and minor keys.

History
In the 19th century, choro resulted from the style of playing several musical genres (polka, schottische, waltz, mazurka and habanera) by carioca musicians, who were already strongly influenced by African rhythms, principally the lundu and the batuque. The term “choro” was used informally at first to refer to the style of playing, or a particular instrumental ensemble, (e.g. in the 1870s flutist Joaquim Antônio da Silva Callado formed an ensemble called "Choro Carioca", with flute, two guitars and cavaquinho), and later the term referred to the music genre of these ensembles. The accompanying music of the Maxixe (dance) (also called "tango brasileiro") was played by these choro ensembles. Various genres were incorporated as subgenres of choro such as "choro-polca", "choro-lundu", "choro-xote" (from schottische), "choro-mazurca", "choro-valsa" (waltz), "choro-maxixe", "samba-choro", "choro baião".

Just like ragtime in the United States, tango in Argentina and habanera in Cuba, choro springs up as a result of influences of musical styles and rhythms coming from Europe and Africa.

In the beginning (by the 1880s to 1920s), the success of choro came from informal groups of friends (principally composed of workers from the postal, railway and telegraphic services) which played at parties, pubs (botecos), streets and home balls (forrobodós). The mainstay of the repertoire was made of the big hits of Ernesto Nazareth, Chiquinha Gonzaga and other pianists, whose musical scores were published by print houses. By the 1910s, many of the first Brazilian phonograph records were choros.

Much of the mainstream success (by the 1930s to 1940s) of this style of music came from the early days of radio, when bands performed live on the air. By the 1950s and 1960s, it was replaced with urban samba on the radio, but it was still alive in amateur circles called "rodas de choro" (choro gatherings in residences and botecos), the most famous ones being the roda de choro in the house of composer and musician Jacob do Bandolim, in the Jacarepaguá neighborhood in Rio; and the "roda de choro" in the pub "Suvaco de Cobra" (Snake's Armpit) in the Penha neighborhood in the same town.

In the late 1970s there was a successful effort to revitalize the genre in the mainstream, through TV-sponsored nationwide festivals in 1977 and 1978, which attracted a new, younger generation of professional musicians and listeners. Thanks in great part to these efforts, choro music remains strong in Brazil. More recently, choro has attracted the attention of musicians in the United States, such as Mike Marshall and Maurita Murphy Mead, who have brought this kind of music to a new audience.

Most Brazilian classical composers recognize the sophistication of choro and its major importance in Brazilian instrumental music. Radamés Gnattali said it was the most sophisticated instrumental popular music in the world. Heitor Villa-Lobos defined choro as the true incarnation of Brazilian soul.
Notably, both composers had some of their music inspired by choro, dressing it with classical tradition.  The French composer Darius Milhaud was enchanted by choro when he lived in Brazil (in 1917) and he composed the ballet Le Boeuf sur le toit, in which he quotes close to 30 Brazilian tunes.

According to Aquiles Rique Reis (a Brazilian singer), ”Choro is classical music played with bare feet and callus on the hands”

Notable choro compositions
 "Brejeiro" (Ernesto Nazareth)
 "Apanhei-te Cavaquinho" (Ernesto Nazareth)
 "Odeon" (Ernesto Nazareth)
 "Corta Jaca" (Chiquinha Gonzaga)
 "Carinhoso" (Pixinguinha)
 "Lamentos" (Pixinguinha)
 "Descendo a Serra" (Pixinguinha)
 "Cochichando" (Pixinguinha)
 "Segura Ele" (Pixinguinha)
 "Um a zero" (Pixinguinha)
 "Vou Vivendo" (Pixinguinha)
 "Sete cordas" (Raphael Rabello)
 "Brasileirinho" (Waldir Azevedo)
 "Pedacinhos do Céu" (Waldir Azevedo)
 "Dôce de Coco" (Jacob do Bandolim)
 "Noites Cariocas" (Jacob do Bandolim)
 "Tico-Tico no Fubá" (Zequinha de Abreu)
 "Meu caro amigo" (Chico Buarque and Francis Hime)
 "Meu amigo Radamés" (Antonio Carlos Jobim)
 "Choros nos. 1 to 14" (Concert music inspired by Choro, by Heitor Villa-Lobos)
 "Choro no. 2" (Armando Neves)

See also
Lundu
Frevo
Maxixe
Samba
Jongo

Suggested reading
Livingston-Isenhour, T., and Garcia, T. G. C. (2005). Choro: A Social History of a Brazilian Popular Music. Bloomington, Indiana: Indiana University Press.
Koidin, Julie (2011). Os Sorrisos do Choro:  Uma Jornada Musical Através de Caminhos Cruzados. São Paulo: Global Choro Music.
Koidin, Julie (2013). "Choro Conversations: Pursuing Life, Love and Brazil's Musical Identity," - Fremont, California: Global Choro Music.
AMARAL JÚNIOR, José de Almeida (2013). "Chorando na Garoa - Memórias Musicais de São Paulo". São Paulo: Fundação Theatro Municipal de São Paulo.

Films
2005 - Brasileirinho. Directed by Mika Kaurismäki.
2016 - "Mexicano: Carlito y La Choro Fábrica". Directed by Cristina Gonzalez.

External links
Abdallah Harati, 7 Strings
Choro de Rua, Italy
Regional de NY
Chorolê - The Israeli Choro Ensemble
Agenda do Samba & Choro
Maria-Brazil - Brazilian Culture on the Web
ChoroMusic.com Play Along Brazilian Choro
Pe de Cana, choro trio band from Vancouver-Canada
Choro das 3, three young sisters' group
Brazil Essence - Majorca, Spain
Casa de Choro - Toulouse, France
Clube do Choro de Torino
Dois no Choro, Julie Koidin flute and Paulinho Garcia guitar and vocals
Chorinho e.V.
North American workshops in ensemble choro playing
EPM Holanda Musicschool for Brazilian choro in Rotterdam the Netherlands

Notes

 
Brazilian music
Brazilian styles of music
 
Polka derivatives